Lulu Sun (formerly known as Lulu Radovcic; born 14 April 2001) is a Swiss tennis player. She has a career-high singles ranking by the WTA of 247, achieved on 31 October 2022, and a best doubles ranking of world No. 329, reached on 27 June 2022.

Career
Sun played college tennis at the University of Texas at Austin. She won her first major ITF title at the 2022 Saint-Gaudens Open, partnering Fernanda Contreras in doubles.
She made her WTA Tour main-draw debut at the 2022 Morocco Open just two days later, where she received a wildcard into the singles draw.

Personal life
Having moved with her family from New Zealand to Geneva when still a toddler, she represented Switzerland as a junior, finishing runner-up with Violet Apisah in the 2018 Australian Open girls' doubles, but played under the New Zealand flag at junior Wimbledon that year while waiting for a new Swiss passport, losing in the second round in singles and the first round in doubles. She has an older sister Phenomena Radovcic (born in 1998) who played in some professional tournaments until 2016.

Grand Slam performance timelines

Singles

ITF Circuit finals

Singles: 8 (4 titles, 4 runner-ups)

Doubles: 6 (2 titles, 4 runner–ups)

Junior Grand Slam finals

Doubles (0–1)

References

External links
 
 

2001 births
Living people
Swiss female tennis players
New Zealand female tennis players
Tennis players from Geneva
Texas Longhorns women's tennis players
Swiss people of Hong Kong descent
Swiss people of Croatian descent
People from Te Anau
Tennis players at the 2018 Summer Youth Olympics
New Zealand people of Hong Kong descent